

See also
 List of sculptures of presidents of the United States
 Mount Rushmore
 Statue of Thomas Jefferson (Decatur, Georgia)
 Statue of Thomas Jefferson (Hempstead, New York)
 Presidential memorials in the United States

Jefferson, Thomas